Assacorkin Island is an uninhabited island in Chincoteague Bay. The island is within the borders of Worcester County in the state of Maryland. Assacorkin Island is located just northeast of the larger Mills Island.

References 

Uninhabited islands of Maryland